Sigurður Grétarsson (born 2 May 1962) is an Icelandic former footballer who played as a striker. After retiring, he worked as a football manager.

He is the older brother of former international player Arnar Grétarsson.

Club career
Sigurður started at Breiðablik and later became very successful in the Swiss League with Luzern and Grasshopper Zürich. He finished his playing career at his first club, Breiðablik, where he became player-manager.

International career
He made his debut for Iceland in 1980 and went on to win 46 caps, scoring eight goals. He played his last international match in a June 1993 World Cup qualifier against Russia.

References

External links
 

1962 births
Living people
Sigurdur Gretarsson
Sigurdur Gretarsson
Sigurdur Gretarsson
FC 08 Homburg players
Tennis Borussia Berlin players
Iraklis Thessaloniki F.C. players
FC Luzern players
Grasshopper Club Zürich players
Sigurdur Gretarsson
2. Bundesliga players
Expatriate footballers in Germany
Association football forwards
Valur (men's football) managers
Icelandic football managers